The Plaza de toros El Progreso was a bullring in the Mexican city of Guadalajara, Jalisco. It was used for bullfighting and also for hosting musical events. The venue could hold 14,000 people and was built in 1856.

History 

This venue was inaugurated in 1856, with a bullfight starring matador Lizo Zamora, who charged 50 pesos for fighting five bulls from haciendas near the capital city of Jalisco, when some streets of Guadalajara were cobbled, like the ones near this bullring, and others were simply dirt roads, generally in the suburbs.

Bullfighters such as [[Rodolfo Gaona |Rodolfo Gaona The Caliph of León]], Juan Silveti, as well as the novillero , fought bulls on the sand of this bullring.

 Last bullfight 
The six bulls that were fought that Monday afternoon were three from a  Valle de Guadalupe, Jalisco, fighting-bull ranch named San Mateo (third, fifth, and sixth, as per the order of their appearance), and three from a Zacatecan fighting-bull ranch named Valparaíso (first, second, and fourth). The "Farewell" walking around the bullring was carried out by the two matadors, their subordinates, the businessman Ignacio García Aceves, VIPs, picturesque characters, and an endless number of gatecrashers, while the public, which packed the venue, sang Las golondrinas'', composed by Mexican physician and songwriter Narciso Serradell Sevilla.

Demolition 
Days after the final bullfight, and after more than 122 years of functioning as a bullfighting venue, the authorities of the State of Jalisco commissioned architect  to demolish the bullring and many buildings and houses in downtown Guadalajara, in an area of 8.64 acres or 376,737 square feet (35,000 square meters), to make way for the construction of Plaza Tapatía, which was inaugurated on 5 February 1982 by the then President of Mexico, José López Portillo, and the then Governor of Jalisco, Flavio Romero de Velasco.

Description 
This venue was a first-class bullring, although at the beginning –1856– the maximum capacity was 3,000 spectators, later it had several extensions, until it had a capacity for 14,000 seated fans.

References 

El Progreso
Sports venues in Jalisco
Bullfighting
Defunct sports venues in Mexico